The Fires of Spring (1949) is the second book and first novel published by American author James A. Michener.  Usually known for his multi-generational epics of historical fiction, The Fires of Spring was written as a partially autobiographical bildungsroman in which Michener's proxy, young orphan David Harper, searches for meaning and romance in pre-World War II Pennsylvania.

The book Spring Fire (by Marijane Meaker, under the pseudonym "Vin Packer") was titled that by an editor in order to confuse potential readers with The Fires of Spring.

1949 American novels
Novels by James A. Michener
Random House books
Novels about orphans
Novels set in Pennsylvania
American bildungsromans
1949 debut novels